Akaba as the name of places or people occurs in various (etymologically unconnected) languages and cultures. It may refer to:
Akaba (surname)
Akaba of Dahomey, an 18th-century king of the African kingdom of Dahomey in present-day Benin
Akaba, Togo, small town in the country of Togo
Akaba, Uganda, small town in the Nebbi District of Northern Uganda
 Akaba, an alternate spelling for Aqaba, Jordan
Akaba (meteorite), a meteorite which fell in 1949 near Ma'an, Jordan
 Akaba (band), a Swedish band of former members Pineforest Crunch and Reminder

See also
Al Aqabah (disambiguation), for several places in the Levant